Supraethnicity (from Latin prefix  / "above" and Ancient Greek word  / "ethnos = people") is a scholarly neologism, used mainly in social sciences as a formal designation for a particular structural category that lies "above" the basic level of ethnicity. It is often paired with subethnicity, a similar technical term with the exact opposite meaning, also designating a particular structural category, but that which lies "under" the level of ethnicity. Both terms are used in ethnic studies in order to describe structural and functional relations between basic (common) form of ethnic identity and various related phenomena that are classified as belonging to "higher" (supraethnic) or "lower" (subethnic) levels. Formally, both categories (supraethnic and subethnic) are designating levels, not the contents. For example, there are several distinctive phenomena that are manifested on the supraethnic level, like: metaethnicity, multiethnicity (pluriethnicity), panethnicity, polyethnicity, or transethnicity, each of them having their own distinctive contents, but all of them sharing the same structural "supraethnic" level. There have been attempts to define some common, not only structural but also functional properties of supraethnicity, but such attempts were challenged by the present state of terminological diversity and inconsistency within the ethnic studies.

See also

References

Sources

 
 
 
 
 
 
 
 
 

Ethnicity